Terry Nelson (born May 20, 1951), is a former American professional football player. A 6'2", 233 lbs. tight end from Arkansas-Pine Bluff, Nelson played 8 seasons from 1973-1980 for the Los Angeles Rams wearing #83. He was a starter in Super Bowl XIV.

References

1951 births
Living people
People from Arkadelphia, Arkansas
Players of American football from Arkansas
American football tight ends
Arkansas–Pine Bluff Golden Lions football players
Los Angeles Rams players